Peter Lauer is an American music video and television director.

He directed the music videos "Run's House" for Run-DMC and edited "It Takes Two" for Rob Base and DJ E-Z Rock.

Lauer made his television directorial debut in 1993 directing an episode of The Adventures of Pete & Pete. He has since directed episodes of The Secret World of Alex Mack, Strangers with Candy, Dead Like Me, Arrested Development, Malcolm in the Middle, Chuck, Scrubs, Wonderfalls, Remember WENN, Sons of Tucson, and the Nickelodeon film Cry Baby Lane among other series. In 2014, Lauer has directed episodes of Awkward and Finding Carter.

References

External links

American music video directors
American television directors
Living people
Place of birth missing (living people)
Year of birth missing (living people)